Cerulean is a census-designated place and unincorporated community in Trigg County, Kentucky, United States.  At one time, it was a city, incorporated as Cerulean Springs.  It lies along Kentucky Routes 124 and 126 northeast of the city of Cadiz, the county seat of Trigg County.  Its elevation is 512 feet (156 m), and it is located at  (36.9594919, -87.7100107).  It has a post office with the ZIP code 42215.

The community is part of the Clarksville, TN–KY Metropolitan Statistical Area.

Geography
The majority of Cerulean is located in Trigg County with a small portion in Christian County.

Demographics

History
The local 19th-century health resort Cerulean Springs earned a reputation throughout the Upper South. According to legend, the spring's color was changed to cerulean by the New Madrid earthquake of 1811. The point of greatest eclipse for the solar eclipse of August 21, 2017, was at Orchardale, a farm located near Cerulean.

Schools

Most students in Cerulean attend Trigg County Public Schools in Cadiz.  Those who live within the Christian County Borders attend Christian County Public Schools in Hopkinsville, Kentucky.

References

External links
 Trigg County Public Schools, Kentucky

Census-designated places in Trigg County, Kentucky
Former municipalities in Kentucky
Unincorporated communities in Kentucky
Clarksville metropolitan area
Census-designated places in Kentucky